Charles Sedley may refer to:

Sir Charles Sedley, 5th Baronet (1639-1701), dramatist, wit and politician
Sir Charles Sedley, 1st Baronet, of Southwell (c. 1695-1730) of the Sedley baronets of South Fleet, illegitimate son of Sir Charles Sedley, 5th Baronet
Sir Charles Sedley, 2nd Baronet (c. 1721-1778), MP, grandson of Sir Charles Sedley, 5th Baronet
Sir Charles Sedley, 4th Baronet (died 1702) of the Sedley baronets of Great Chart
Sir Charles Sedley, 8th Baronet (died c. 1770) of the Sedley baronets of Great Chart